Blumentritt station is a railway station located on the South Main Line in the city of Manila, Philippines. It derives its name from nearby Blumentritt Road, which is named after the Bohemian professor Ferdinand Blumentritt, a friend of José Rizal and sympathizer of the Filipino cause.

The station is the second station southbound from Tutuban.

Blumentritt station is one of four stations whose original platforms have been retained for service. However, it is unique in the sense that the new platforms designed to accommodate new PNR diesel multiple units are not connected to the station's original platforms, unlike solutions employed at stations such as España, where the new platforms are directly connected to the original ones.  The old platforms are still used to accommodate Commuter Express locomotives and especially intercity trains.

History
Blumentritt, then San Lazaro, was opened on December 22, 1905, as a station originally part of the Antipolo and Montalban lines; the Blumentritt-Santa Mesa segment of the current PNR Southrail was part of the defunct line but now it is being used for the PNR Metro South Commuter services.

Station Layout

Transportation links
Blumentritt station is accessible by jeepneys and buses plying the Rizal Avenue route. Tricycles are also used to navigate around the station's immediate vicinity.

A Manila Light Rail Transit System station, also named Blumentritt, is located immediately above the station.

Nearby landmarks
The station is near major landmarks such as the Blumentritt Market, SM City San Lazaro (previously the San Lazaro Hippodrome), the Chinese General Hospital and Medical Center,  Manila North Cemetery, and Manuel L. Quezon High School.

References

Philippine National Railways stations
Railway stations in Metro Manila
Railway stations opened in 2009
Buildings and structures in Santa Cruz, Manila